The Hills Have Eyes is an American horror franchise that consists of four horror films, as well as a graphic novel and merchandise. The first film was released in 1977, The Hills Have Eyes; the series was rebooted in a 2006 remake. The films focus on a group of people stranded in a desert who become hunted by a clan of deformed cannibals in the surrounding hills. The films collectively grossed over $132 million at the box-office worldwide. The series was created by Wes Craven who is known for the Nightmare on Elm Street and Scream films. The series has featured actors and actresses including Dee Wallace, Aaron Stanford, Michael Berryman and Emilie de Ravin.

Films

Reception

Box office

Critical reception
Most of the films have received mixed reception from critics.

Comics

To coincide with the release of The Hills Have Eyes 2, Fox Atomic Comics released a graphic novel set in the continuity of the remake series in July 2007. The Hills Have Eyes: The Beginning reveals the genesis of the mutants, who were once normal people, ignorant to the rest of the world, and how they evolved into horrific creatures. It was written by Jimmy Palmiotti and Justin Gray, and drawn by John Higgins.

References

External links

The Hills Have Eyes
20th Century Studios franchises
Searchlight Pictures franchises
Horror film franchises
Films adapted into comics